Siame is a Zambian surname. Notable people with the surname include:

 David Siame (born 1976), Zambian former football striker
 Lameck Siame (born 1997), Zambian football goalkeeper
 Sydney Siame (born 1997), Zambian sprinter

See also
 Made Siamé (1885–1974), French stage and film actress
 Siam (disambiguation)